My Father, My Son may refer to:
 Books
 My Father - My Son, a 1958 autobiography by Edward G. Robinson Jr., co-written with author William R. Duffy
 My Father, My Son, a 1986 book by John Pekkanen, in collaboration with Admiral Elmo Zumwalt, Jr. and Lt. Elmo Zumwalt III, about Elmo Zumwalt III's battle with cancer, believed to have been caused by Agent Orange during the Vietnam War
  My Father, My Son, a 1988 British historic novel by Sheelagh Kelly
 Film and TV
My Father, My Son (TV movie), a 1988 US made-for-TV film, based on Pekkanen's book about Admiral Zumwalt and his son
 A 1966 episode of the US TV series  Gunsmoke
 A 1982 episode of the US TV series Dallas
 The 2005 Turkish film My Father and My Son